Raugi Yu is a Canadian actor. He is best known for his role as Kam Fong in "JPod". He is also a director and acting coach. Yu trained at the Dome Theatre in Montreal. He then moved to Vancouver, British Columbia, where he earned his BFA through the acting program at the University of British Columbia.

Television career 
In the late 1990s, Yu began appearing on television. In 1998, he appeared in one episode of The Sentinel. In 2001, he was the voice of the Cook in several episodes of the PBS children's animated series, Sagwa, the Chinese Siamese Cat and also in an episode of Dark Angel. From 2002 – 2004, he appeared in three episodes of Da Vinci's Inquest. He was seen in one episode of Gather Up Little People episodes of Dead Like Me in 2003, two episodes of The Dead Zone in 2003 and 2004, as well as playing the Chinese son in the film Spook in 2003.

In 2005, he also supplied the voice of Wendy's Butler in an episode of the animated series The Cramp Twins. He is also friends with Selene Rose – a notable member of UBC Improv of Vancouver, British Columbia

In 2006, Yu appeared in the television shows Intelligence, and Masters Of Horror. In 2007, he played Dennis in When a Man Falls in the Forest and Wayne Kwan in an episode of Eureka. Most recently, Yu was seen as Kam Fong on the series JPod.

Yu was part of the recurring cast of Mr. Young as Dang the janitor.

In the 2017 film 8 Minutes Ahead, Yu plays one of the lead roles, Danny.

Theatre 
During his early acting years, Yu was seen in several theatre productions, which soon grew into his film and television work.

For several years, during the 90s and early 2000s, Yu was an actor at Bard On The Beach in Vancouver, where he now continues to be an acting coach.

In 2002, Yu portrayed The King Of Siam in Theatre Under The Star's theatre production of The King And I.

Yu played Dom in The Shoplifters, a play written and directed by Morris Panych, in 2019.

Directing 
In the spring of 2008, Yu directed The Odd Couple for the Vancouver Asian Canadian Theatre company.

As of 2010–2011, Raugi teaches acting courses at New Image College of Fine Arts in Vancouver, British Columbia. He also teaches the summer Young Shakespearian program which Bard puts on every year for youth ages eight to eighteen.

Filmography

Film 
 Diary of a Wimpy Kid (2010) as Vice Principal Roy
 Marmaduke (2010) as Drama Trainer

Television 
 The Sentinel (1998) as Monk 
 Police Academy: The Series (1998) as Manager
 Sagwa, the Chinese Siamese Cat (2001) as Cook 
 Dark Angel (2001) as Ticket Taker
 Da Vinci's Inquest (2002–2004) as Constable
 Dead Like Me (2003) as Raugi
 The Dead Zone (2003-2004) as Michael Nazawa
 The Cramp Twins (2005) as Wendy's Butler 
 The Evidence (2006) as CSU Cop 
 Intelligence (2006) as Henry Yu 
 Masters Of Horror (2006) as Phantom
 Eureka (2007) as Wayne Kwan 
 JPod (2008) as Kam Fong 
 A Fairly Odd Movie: Grow Up, Timmy Turner! (2011) as Asian Waiter
 Mr. Young (2011-2013) as Dang  
 Arrow (2013) as Asian Driver 
 Jinxed (2013) as Science Teacher
 The Stanley Dynamic (2014) as Chapman 
 Supernatural (2016) as Crew Member #2
 Some Assembly Required (2016) as Mr. Jannetty
 Prison Break (2017) as Driver
 Kung Fu (2021) as Professor Chau

Staff work 
 Air Bud: World Pup (2000) - Set Dresser 
 War (2007) - Stunts

References

External links 
 https://web.archive.org/web/20090223183353/http://www.vact.ca/oddcouple_bios.htm

Living people
20th-century Canadian male actors
21st-century Canadian male actors
Canadian acting coaches
Canadian male actors of Chinese descent
Canadian male film actors
Canadian male television actors
Canadian male voice actors
Year of birth missing (living people)